Louis Daeuble Jr. (June 7, 1912 - October 5, 1992) was an American architect who designed many buildings in El Paso, Texas.

Life
Daeuble was born on June 7, 1912 in Leavenworth, Kansas. He graduated from El Paso High School and Texas A&M University.

Daeuble began his career as a draftsman for architect Percy W. McGhee. From 1945 to 1977, he was a partner in Carroll and Daeuble, later known as Carroll, Daeuble, DuSang and Rand, and he maintained his own practice from 1977 to 1990. He helped design many buildings in El Paso, Texas, including the El Paso Museum of Art, the El Paso Public Library, the El Paso Civic Center and the Sun Bowl Stadium. He also designed the Liberal Arts Building on the campus of the University of Texas at El Paso, and places of worship like the First Presbyterian Church and Temple Mount Sinai in El Paso.

With his wife, nee Margaret Elizabeth Barron, Daeuble had two sons and a daughter. He died on October 5, 1992 in El Paso, Texas.

References

1912 births
1992 deaths
People from Leavenworth, Kansas
People from El Paso, Texas
Texas A&M University alumni
Architects from Texas
20th-century American architects